Tom Baker Cancer Centre (TBCC) is a tertiary care facility for Southern Alberta, named for the founding chairman of the Alberta Cancer Board, and is one of two tertiary cancer centres in the province. It is a lead Cancer Centre in southern Alberta for prevention, research and treatment programs and provides many advanced medical services, as well as supportive care for both inpatients and outpatients. The Cancer Centre also conducts research through the Charbonneau Cancer Institute and houses a comprehensive palliative care facility.

The Cancer Centre is located at the Foothills Medical Centre  and is physically attached to the Special Services Building, which too provides special, advanced medical services to patients.

See also
 Cross Cancer Institute
Alberta Health Services
Alberta Cancer Foundation
List of hospitals in Canada

References 

Cancer hospitals
Health in Calgary
Hospitals established in 1981